Alisha is the debut album by American freestyle and dance-pop artist Alisha. It was released in the US in 1985 by Vanguard Records.

Background
At age 14, Alisha got the attention of producer Mark S. Berry when a demo tape of hers got to him through Vanguard Records. Berry was looking for a vocalist for the track "All Night Passion" and after its success, he went on to produce her debut album.

The album was released on 12" vinyl in 1985. The original vinyl release contains the album versions of "Stargazing" and "Baby Talk". The album was released on CD in 1986, and the original mixes of "Stargazing" and "Baby Talk" were replaced by their extended dance mixes. 

"Baby Talk" was originally recorded by Gregg Brown and released in the UK in 1984, and "One Little Lie", written by singer-songwriter Kirsty MacColl, was recorded by Anni-Frid Lyngstad of ABBA, and released on her 1984 album Shine.

Singles and chart performance
The album spawned many club hits, "All Night Passion" was released in 1984 and reached No. 4 on the Hot Dance Club charts, staying there for 2 weeks. "Too Turned On" was released as a follow up single and peaked at No. 6 on the Hot Dance Club charts in July 1985. Alisha's biggest single to date "Baby Talk" followed, peaking at No. 1 on the Hot Dance Club chart in December 1985 for one week. It was also her first appearance on the Billboard Hot 100, peaking at No. 68 in February 1986. "Stargazing" was released as the final single in the US, reaching No. 16 on the Hot Dance Club charts in July 1986, and "Boys Will Be Boys" was released as a single in Germany. The album did not chart on the Billboard Top 200.

Track listing

Personnel
Album credits adapted from the liner notes of Alisha.

Alisha - vocals
Mark Berry - producer, musician
The Brass Bed Factory - photography prop
Joel Broddsky - photography
Greg Brown - composer
Simon Climie - composer
Bev Collins - background vocals
Carol Collins - background vocals
Alexandra Forbes - composer
Greco & Emmi, Inc. - album design
Jimmy Halperin - composer, musician
Chuck Hammer - musician
Chris Hills - musician
Tay Hoyle - engineer
Robbie Kilgore - musician
Andrea La Russo - composer

Nikki Lauren - background vocals
Logankoya - composer
Kirsty MacColl - composer
Penny Mealing - background vocals
Richard Musk - musician
Shep Pettibone - mixer, additional producer, musician
Mark Richardson - musician
Beth Rudetsky - background vocals
Michael Rudetsky - arranger
Steve Schwartz - musician
Peggy Stanziale - composer
Rick Tarbox - composer
Jim Tunnel - musician, background vocals
Andy Wallace - musician, remix engineer
Jeff Zaraya - executive producer
Paul Zinman - musician, engineer

References

1985 albums
Vanguard Records albums
Alisha (singer) albums